Radoslav Židek (born October 15, 1981 in Žilina) is a snowboarder who became the first Slovak to win a Winter Olympics medal. He won a silver in Snowboard Cross at the 2006 Winter Olympics.

External links

Slovak male snowboarders
Olympic snowboarders of Slovakia
Living people
1981 births
Snowboarders at the 2006 Winter Olympics
Olympic silver medalists for Slovakia
Sportspeople from Žilina
Olympic medalists in snowboarding
Medalists at the 2006 Winter Olympics